Stuart Buchanan Semple  (born 12 September 1980) is a multidisciplinary British artist working across painting, sculpture, happenings, technology and activism. He is well known for his sociologically engaged works that often discuss youth politics, accessibility and democracy. Semple's work has strong links with Richard Hamilton's Pop Art, but has a contemporary emphasis on latent fear and threat rather than Hamilton's consumer culture and glamour.

Life and career
Semple was born in Bournemouth, Dorset. He studied Advanced Art and Design at Bournemouth and Poole College, and Painting and Printmaking at Bretton Hall College in Yorkshire. Semple speaks about the inspiration from his grandfather whose memory inspired a jumper Semple designed. Semple's mother also took him to the National Gallery and he described that moment being the main catalyst in becoming an artist when he saw Van Gogh's Sunflowers aged 7.

In 2004, art dealer Anthony d'Offay flew his portfolio to New York and persuaded him to move to London. A 2007 solo exhibition saw $1 million sales within the first five minutes and a recent London exhibition had presales to a Foundation of $1 million.

In 2010 Semple disclosed in an interview with The Evening Standard he had had a sudden near death experience in 2000 following an allergic reaction. Semple referenced the event in an artwork painted that year; "This is the flatline of my ECG showing where I officially died, my vital signs zeroed completely." Semple identifies the experience as being the catalyst that motivated him to dedicate his life to making art.

In 1999 Semple became one of the first artists to utilise the Internet and the potential of digital and created an early online community on eBay who followed drawings he posted up each night.  Semple's continual appropriation of digital mediums put him in The Guardian'''s Ten Best Art Auctions alongside Damien Hirst, Ai Weiwei and Edvard Munch.

In 2012 Semple was the first visual artist to release a body of work on iTunes called "EXIT" that was commissioned to be a fully digital experience. His desire to create and distribute this series via iTunes was so that it could be directly accessed affordably in every household worldwide which built on his exploration of the internet and accessibility to contemporary art. Who's Jack "Stuart Semple 1st Artist On iTunes" The digital artwork "The Effect" which was exhibited during the Suspend Disbelief exhibition is viewable and possible to own on Sedition.

Semple is quoted in The Art Newspaper "Instagram is such a direct medium" as a way for artists to share their work in an article about how social media can become a new exhibition space. In 2015, Semple created a new series of 5 browser based artworks as websites and offered each site for sale on eBay to create a way for digital art to be simply viewed, bought and sold using hosting.

On the eve of the 2010 general election, the BBC spent the day reporting live from Semple's studio and opening night of his "Happy House" exhibition. The narrative in the collection of works was seen as a prediction and warning of how the country could be affected by the financial situation and policies towards culture.Witherspoon, Jane (2010). "Stuart Semple collection inspired by 'mental' Britain". "BBC NEWS", 6 May 2010. Retrieved from news.bbc.co.uk, 1 June 2014. The opening of "Anxiety Generation" in London in 2014 was reported by Tatler as "just like being at the Brit Awards in the Nineties".

The Art Newspaper reported Semple signed with Next Management in 2013 alongside working with galleries. The Art Newspaper continue debating the traditional gallery model and discuss how dealers and galleries place Semple works in important collections but also the agents and management that handle copyright and licensing.

In January 2012 Semple opened the new North Light Centre for Art and Design at Bournemouth & Poole College and judges a yearly competition of the student's works. Semple has spoken at  The ICA,"Stuart Semple Interviewed by Josh Spero at The ICA", "Joshspero.com "27 November 2011. Retrieved 10 January 2015. The Institute of Ideas, CultureLabel, Amnesty, Jerwood Visual Arts for his digital activity, and for DACS on digital and copyright topics. in 2005, Semple was the youngest member appointed to the Design and Artists Copyright Society creators' council.

Semple has featured on the BBC in 2009 for Blue Peter and in 2011 and 2014 he presented for the BBC's Art & Design series  where he talks about Inspiration Tools & Tips and Idea to Art.

In 2013, Semple created Jump for Australia's Federation Square's public art programme, a 10 x 10m bouncy cloud, and in 2014, Semple represented the British Program for The Night at The Museum festival, releasing thousands of HappyClouds over Moscow. This public art performance has so far also been held in London, Italy, Ireland and Australia.

In 2013 Semple received a medal at The House Of Lords for the UN's first International Day of Happiness and nominated Marilena Borgna and May Gabriel also as his Happiness Heros and spoke to The Independent about the secret to happiness: "My son makes me truly happy... Happiness from real things and from flash things are worlds apart." "My Happy Colouring Flip Book" was published in 2015 as an anti-stress, creative therapy colouring book for adults by Semple and to raise funds for the Mind creative therapies fund.

Philosophy

Semple has sent "Happy Clouds" up into the sky over London initially in direct response to the recession and also in a bid to highlight and spread happiness worldwide, being invited to repeat the artwork in Dublin, Moscow, Australia and Milan."Happy Clouds By Stuart Semple" , "[Wallpaper Magazine]", 23 April 2009. Retrieved 26 May 2009. "I know at times like this it's easy to make creativity a low priority, but I want to show on a very human level that an artistic idea might be able to do something important, even for a fleeting moment." "I don't see why we couldn't spread the happy clouds around the world a bit."First Fortnight "Stuart Semple Happy Clouds" Retrieved 1 June 2014.

Large scale positive public artworks around this theme of happiness has included "Jump", where Melbourne's Federation Square was transformed into an open air white cloud-like trampoline that invited adults to join in. In 2016 "Something Amazing", was held in 6 cities in England and Scotland, who found giant coloured helium balloon sculptures dotted through streets at sunrise, and encouraged people to take and share screenprinted balloons which featured artwork of his yet to be born nephew. The work was discussed by Matilda Battersby in The Independent in context artists including Frida Kahlo, Tracy Emin and Semple tackling the taboo subject of infertility.

Eric Bryant debated Semple and contemporary Pop Art in a seminal ARTnews feature 50 years after Richard Hamilton had defined the movement. "While earlier generations of Pop artists exhibited a similar love-hate relationship with consumer culture and glamour, this group takes on fear and violence." Semple's relationship with current culture, politics and imagery has put him at the forefront of the next generation of debate, where artists now tackle the current climate of fear; "his often disturbing, even sinister works also feature guns, pills, and frequent references to suicide." In being categorised within Pop Art, Aidan Duane debated in The Irish Times how his work brings it up to date.There is a real intelligence at the heart of his art. On the one hand he clearly embraces the throwaway, famous-for-15-minutes soundbite culture of celebrity and distraction. On the other, he stops it in its tracks, recasting its giddy imagery in the slow, fixed medium of paint. He might seem to celebrate it, but he actually doesn't quite trust the world of mass production and communications. His work implies a conviction that there is, or perhaps there better be, something genuine, something real, beyond the glam facade of throwaway culture. In Vogue Italia Stuart Semple discusses his critical relationship with Pop culture in a post Warhol society where it has become a universal language but aims to act removed.

Semple discussed in his Guardian blog the influence of growing up in the 1980s and how that period is vital for our art, seeing "youth culture was a powerful force, bright, seductive and ultimately a lot less hollow". He comments about the rise of the new advertising class that has been replacing our social connections after Thatcherism by "associating products with personal empowerment" which was brought about by "a time of intense atomisation and individualisation to the detriment of community caused a pop cultural language centered around nurturing the ego."

Topics of youth apathy were touched upon in 2014's "Anxiety Generation" exhibition where Semple debated that a risk industry keeps our current generation in a passive state of fear and consumption, not having a war or threat of nuclear destruction that our parents faced, but he feels "There is a misconception that the youth are apathetic, that they sit around playing on their Xboxes and are all connected digitally, not with the rest of the living world. I can't think of anything more active than going out and rioting,"

In 2013, Semple talked to Josh Spero about his career and influences as part of The ICA's Culture Now series. In 2007, when interviewed for Trebuchet Magazine, Semple described how his early experience of pop influenced his approach to art "When I was growing up in the 80s these things (cultural icons) were – I don't know if it's quite right to say they were aspirational, but they certainly gave me my first feelings of something larger. But as you get older you get more jaded so now when you look back at these 'nostalgic' things, you have lost something. Here I've tried to look at them again in such as way as to rediscover that sense of feeling"

In 2013, the Suspend Disbelief exhibition wanted the public to question their relationship with reality and the way we all, in a multitude of ways, suspend belief to survive; that in order to be fully entertained by a movie or a magic trick or certain kinds of media, you need to pause your belief in it as a fiction; the idea that in order to live at all we need to suspend our disbelief in the fact we are dying."Stuart Semple. Suspend Disbelief", Wall Street Journal. September 2013.

Semple discusses his practice towards making exhibition like that of a musical recording artist on the BBC and also in a conversation with IndechsPainting in a way is like a recording of a moment, a live moment, where you were what you did, how you physically moved your body. A music recording is the same. I can think of a series of paintings that go together like an album, that make thematic sense that sit together, that's useful for me. I can get a little phrase, or a hook or a melody in my mind. It's an image idea though and I live with that and churn it over, I might draw it or just remember, then I'll get in the studio and put it down. Sometimes I make a little study, I guess that's like a musicians demo of a song. Then I work them into bigger finished things. Collaging is the same as musical sampling. Layers in a painting are like layers in a mix.

In an interview with Doug McClemont he refers to the mimetic industries of mass-production; which has been a running critique in Semple's work. He discussed the "idea of taking the mechanization out the pop stuff. Because I find a lot of it non-emotive."  He also alluded more to his studio practice;  "I used to paint alone when I had a tiny studio middle of nowhere. It had mice and was freezing. Now I have assistants who help me paint, because I'm doing massive, massive stuff, right now. It's not the same..."  In 2014 he discussed his studio routine with The Irish Times explaining how he preferred to be more solitary but market pressures had dictated him to expand his studio.Frizell, Nell (2013)."Stuart Semple: Artist and curator", Ideas Tap, 27 March 2013. Retrieved 27 May 2014. His studio was documented during BBC filming in 2011 and 2014.

In 2014 the solo exhibition "Anxiety Generation" takes a snap shot of contemporary culture and communication. "My generation is the fulcrum for decades of anxiety and we have been made so inert and fearful that we dare not even face it to understand what it is." Reviewed in Trebuchet "Where previous generations contended with the death of god as a surety, Semple's work contends with information and self in the same way... Semple is suggesting that reality and fantasy are undifferentiated in how society sees and acts. The representational world, the virtual world, is as real as it can get for Westerners trying to make sense of a flickering reality that mirrors through generalities and stereotypes.

Reviewed in Candid Magazine "Here is an artist concerned with the idea of shaking the population out of lethargy and asking the difficult questions like why does it take a war or other major disaster to get us talking to our neighbours and connecting as a community? A sentiment depicted with unflinching bluntness in Technicolour Hiroshima (2014), his use of Morrissey lyrics "[...] the bomb that will bring us together" literally spelling out our failing as a community. Semple uses snippets, scenes and headlines from all manner of popular culture to relate to the viewer and draw them into the conversation."

Conflict with Anish Kapoor
Semple came into conflict with the artist Anish Kapoor when Kapoor purchased exclusive artistic rights to the "world's blackest" material, Vantablack, in 2016. Vantablack is made of microscopic stems of carbon that are 300 times as tall as they are wide, so that 99.6% of all light gets trapped in the network of stems. The material was being developed for scientific and military use because of its masking ability. It has the potential to hide stealth aircraft; and block out stray light reflections inside powerful telescopes, enabling them to see faint astronomical objects.

After purchasing the rights to Vantablack in 2016, Kapoor faced a backlash from the artist community. Artist Christian Furr commented that he had "never heard of an artist monopolising a material. All the best artists have had a thing for pure black – Turner, Manet, Goya ... This black is like dynamite in the art world. We should be able to use it. It isn't right that it belongs to one man." Semple positioned himself at the forefront of this backlash when he released PINK – the world's pinkest pink paint – in retaliation. Semple explicitly banned Kapoor from buying the paint, stating that "We all remember kids at school who wouldn't share their colouring pencils, but then they ended up on their own with no friends. It's cool, Anish can have his black. But the rest of us will be playing with the rainbow!"

Purchasers of PINK are required to make a legal declaration during the online checkout process, confirming that: "you are not Anish Kapoor, you are in no way affiliated to Anish Kapoor, you are not purchasing this item on behalf of Anish Kapoor or an associate of Anish Kapoor. To the best of your knowledge, information and belief this paint will not make its way into the hands of Anish Kapoor." Kapoor managed to acquire the pigment and on his Instagram account posted a picture showing his middle finger dipped in PINK, with the caption "Up yours #pink." Semple responded by describing Kapoor as "some kind of end-of-game super baddie" who "should be old enough to know better" after Kapoor's Instagram post. Roisin O'Connor writing for The Independent called it "one of the most spectacular displays of pettiness" ... "these are two grown men fighting over who gets to use the pretty colours."

On 3 February 2017 Semple hit back at Kapoor with the release of his own version of Vantablack, dubbed "Better Black". Semple admits that the paint is not perfect, but says it is better because it is affordable and available to everyone. "Better Black" comes as a pigment and an acrylic "super-base" which when combined replicates the light-absorbing technology of Vantablack.  Black 2.0 followed on 30 March 2017. Since then, Semple's Culture Hustle has released a Black 3.0, and "Diamond Dust", described as the world's "most glittery glitter" (equally forbidden to Kapoor).

In 2022 Semple released a limited edition pigment called Incredibly Kleinish Blue, aiming to "democratise" yet another color, the IKB patented by Yves Klein. 

Activism
Semple has supported Amnesty International and has created artworks for the Freedom of Expression Campaign. "There are more artists living in East London than in the whole of Renaissance Italy and we're doing all sorts of weird and wonderful things every day," he pointed out, "but there are other people all over the world who don't have the privilege of being able to say what they think." He also spoke for Amnesty about positive mental health being a Human Right alongside Joe Pantoliano and Colm O'Gorman during Ireland's "First Fortnight" arts festival.

In 2010 Semple spoke for the first time about how his life changed after a near death experience a decade earlier. "Up until that day I was a normal kid, I went to art school, I was like everyone else ... Then I had this awful week when I had a huge allergic reaction, my tongue swelled up so big I could hardly breathe and I found myself in a hospital bed, dying."

2011 Semple was made an Ambassador for mental health charity Mind. He initiated the Creative Therapies fund within the organisation which he launched with Stephen Fry and Melvyn Bragg and curated the exhibition & auction "Mindful" that included works from Jake & Dinos Chapman, Mat Collishaw, Tracey Emin, Mona Hatoum, Sarah Lucas and Sebastian Horsley.

Semple recently created a whole body of work and short film for a solo booth at London's ART13 with all proceeds in aid of the Mind Creative Therapies fund  For Mind's Time To Change campaign he designed a series of well wishing e-cards and temporary tattoos

"My Happy Place" was a citywide exhibition in Coventry that coincided with 2015 World Mental Health Day and saw live events, film, food, art and sculpture initiated and created by Semple with Coventry's The Pod collective. Semple's Happy Place consisted of a Unicorn shaped spinning disco mirror ball.

The Creative Therapies fund has backed projects nationwide since 2012 and has stepped in to save some groups where local government funding had been cut. Semple talks about his understanding in a Mind interview "...Often those suffering find it hard to express their feelings with words, but being creative in a proper therapeutic environment with trained therapists is a very powerful path to healing. The results are phenomenal I meet and hear from so many people who literally tell me creative therapy has changed their lives so I'm on a real mission to help people understand that and to spread it as far as I can"."The Creative Therapies Fund", "Mind.org.uk"

Semple was vocal about the Arts Cuts imposed following the recession making an artwork "The First Cut" which was exhibited in Hong Kong as part of "The British Cut" exhibition, showcasing major contemporary artists latest work and pictured the scene from the demonstration. His 2010 exhibition "Happy House" opened on the eve of the General Election and the opening was broadcast live on the BBC with the works addressing fears of a future where creativity is overlooked. Semple spoke in The Guardian "I believe that society and its institutions should be doing much more to encourage young people to follow their dreams – helping them to avoid a future of missed opportunity and regret" and in The Huffington Post "The creative industries are a massive contributing factor to our economy and across all those fields we desperately need new dreamers." Semple has appeared on BBC art shows mentoring students, talking about his techniques and inviting them to visit his studio.

Semple met with Vince Cable to discuss the impact on artists lives with proposed changes to Artists Resale Right so lower priced sales still counted as it make a difference to younger artists, also for the royalty to pass to their children, saying "The art world should be trying to support and nurture subsequent generations of talent."Millard, Coline (2012)"Dealers and Artists Clash in the U.K. as the Battle Over Resale Royalties Heats Up" blouinartinfo.com, 15 June 2012. Retrieved from blouinartinfo.com 1 July 2014. He spoke to the Student Handbook about this "The creative industries count towards a huge proportion of our economy, it's something like 16% which is nearly as much as banking. It's short-sighted of the government to put these cuts in place because as a country we are extremely creative, whether it's advertising, graphic design, film making, fashion; we lead in all these fields".

Semple supported MTV Re:Define exhibition at The Goss-Michael Foundation in 2011 with auction proceeds donated to MTV Staying Alive Foundation which enables inspirational youngsters to fight HIV and AIDS in their local communities. He has also supported the Africa Foundation via Art for Africa with Sotheby's, Macmillan De'Longhi Art Auction at Bonhams and the medical foundation Freedom from Torture's art auction where he talks to Claire Hazelton "Art is one of the most powerful things we've got. It does really work, beyond fundraising."Morrison, Sarah (2011) "Britain's Art Pack Does It's Bit To Help", The Independent. 27 November 2011. Retrieved 10 August 2014. In 2011 Semple was featured on postcards for the Anaphylaxis campaign.

Semple featured his work "Nimrod" in the AKA Peace exhibition curated by Jake Chapman with The ICA in 2012 for Peace One Day."AKA Peace: Contemporary artists unite for Peace One Day"  ,"ICA.org.uk", 12 September 2012.

"Deep House Music" was painted for the Articulate exhibition held at Victoria Miro Gallery in 2013 in direct response to moving children's testimony recorded in South Africa and Rwanda, in aid of children's art charity Dramatic Need.

Early career
Semple spoke to David Hayes about his early years "Growing up in the 1990s in Bournemouth I was into indie style – I wore checked trousers and jumpers that were too baggy and had holes in them. Grungy, but in a naff sort of way. The group Placebo were a big inspiration. Brian Molko was amazing; it was as much about how he looked as what he sang. I used to travel up to Harvey Nichols in London and buy Hard Candy nail varnish...I don't think my style is that outrageous but people beep their car horns at me or shout out of the window." Semple mentions his motivation growing up in a small town devoid of culture with just neighbouring extremes of entrepreneurs or rough neighbourhoods and his self-education over three years reading in Borders every morning.

Semple took the persona of "Nancyboy" after his near death experience and produced over 3000 works of art between 1999 and 2003 that were sold via eBay each night at a set time creating an early online community and becoming one of the first artists to utilise the internet in their work.Mills, Jack (2012)."STUART SEMPLE: Post Adolescent Idealistic Phase", "Wonderland Magazine", 14 June 2012. Retrieved 27 May 2014.

In 2002 he had his first major London solo exhibition at the A&D Gallery.A&D exhibition list, "aanddgallery.com". Retrieved 3 December 2011. It was called Stolen Language – the art of Nancyboy. It incorporated fragments and images that he identified with in popular culture and remixed into a personal narrative consisting of large paintings, screen prints, sculptures, T-shirts and panels. 10 final "nancyboys" were created in 2009 and auctioned once again via eBay with all proceeds donated to the UK charity Mind after his grandmother became diagnosed with schizophrenia.Volt Magazine "Keep It Semple". Retrieved 15 June 2010.

The Nancyboy Decade exhibition was organised by the original collectors who exhibited their early drawings and canvases commemorate to the 10 years.

Debbie Harry bought her first Semple painting in 2004, he suggested the same price of $200 she had paid for her first Basquiat canvas in memory of this.

Semple was commissioned to create a memorial with debris collected from the 2004 Momart warehouse fire.  Semple packaged them in 8 plastic boxes under the title Burn Baby Burn. The boxes were then painted over and had slogans in pink lettering, including "RIP YBA", which referred to the Young British Artists, by whom much of the destroyed work had been created. Semple stated that amongst the debris collected there were fragments of Tracey Emin's artwork, Everyone I Have Ever Slept With 1963–1995 ("the tent").

In 2005 Semple produced an exhibition of his works in an abandoned Docklands warehouse in East London, called Post Pop Paradise. Also that year he included a painting into the Saatchi Gallery  which included the words "British Painting Still Rocks" as reaction to Charles Saatchi's comments that the YBA artists would be nothing more than a footnote in the history of art.Reynolds, Nigel (2005). Daily Telegraph "Saatchi rumbles protest painting", Daily Telegraph, 6 July 2005. Retrieved 2 July 2007.Leitch, Luke (2005). "Brit painter in protest at 'banned' Saatchi art", Evening Standard, 5 July 2005. Retrieved from highbeam.com, 2 July 2007.

In 2006 Semple's exhibition "Epiphany" at Martin Summers Fine Art in London questioned the role of religion in modern life in a series of in-your-face paintings that alluded to popular culture, graphic media, advertising and social issues.

 Later works 

In 2007 Semple exhibited "Fake Plastic Love", an exhibition of billboard scale paintings housed within a blacked out environment of East London's Truman Brewery. In 2009 he held his first New York solo exhibition "Everlasting Nothing Less" at Anna Kustera Gallery involving large scale paintings and sculpture which also toured London and Milan.

Semple's "The Happy House" series of paintings built upon the themes explored in earlier collections of fears about his generation, as well as commentary on the artifice of media obsession, politics and disappointment. For the first time he touched on more personal narratives as well as current cultural and political issues. His self-portrait 'A Pounding Outside Poundland' captured the moment Semple was assaulted. He told Esquire'' "I feel I have been analysing popular culture from outside itself by using its own languages".

The solo exhibition "It's Hard To Be A Saint In This City" in Hong Kong heavily featured text in and on sculptures, exploring poetry and song lyrics of adolescent dreaming and isolation.

Solo exhibition "Suspend Disbelief" (2013) in London explored ideas of superstition and illusion. Semple created an immersive exploratory environment with film, paintings and sculpture throughout 15 rooms, where magic tricks were performed by holograms, childhood experiences revisited and he questioned the cycle of life and death within a projection dome where hundreds of flowers perpetually bloom in time lapse. "It's like life without any death because they never wilt."

"Anxiety Generation" (2014) at Delahunty Gallery on Bruton Street was reviewed in Modern Painters by Jonathan R Jones who likened the series to John Carpenter's film "They Live" and referencing Heidegger and Derrida in context of the erasure of text used by Semple "words in his paintings ("too high, too far, too soon," "cool aid," and "Froot Loops") are frequently crossed out, suggesting their inability to convey meaning", and commends the achievement to cut through our cynicism and give images again the power to disturb with his use paint where horror images have been immortalised out of the faster moving social media image world that can see society numb to continual rolling images of war and disaster.

"My Sonic Youth" (2015) held in Fabien Castanier Gallery, Los Angeles, talks about the cultural shift that teenagers have seen in the decades since Kurt Cobain's death. Speaking to Hunger, Semple is quoted: "I hate to be pessimistic but if I'm honest I feel really worried about it. The gap between rich and poor is going to become colossal. Systems of surveillance and control are going to become even more perverse. Physical spaces and virtual ones will continue to become inverted to a point where more life is lived virtually than physically. The level of online surveillance will increase in proportion to the growing level of fear in the population. Initially, this will look like freedom and this fake freedom will cause a shift in the dominant ideologies. Our value system will change until safety is top of our list and our belief in risk and threat will be unwavering. Atomised, individualistic egoism will grow and continue to be temporarily satisfied by shopping. We will become increasingly distanced from history. Counter-cultural voices within the arts will become commodified faster and faster and therefore [be rendered] inert. Our self-identity will become more fluid through use of online avatar and selfie-shaping tools and apps. The result of that will be our true physical selves will become more unloved and we'll feel empty. Profits from anti-depressants will rise."

Curatorial projects 
In 2007, Semple co-curated and featured in the 'Black Market' at the Anna Kustera gallery in New York with Just Another Rich Kid.  Showcasing their collaborative installation piece 'Team Dream Chaos' depicting a provocative teenage girl's bedroom. Semple has curated exhibitions "Mash Ups, post pop fragments and détournements" at The Kowalsky Gallery in 2008 for the Design and Artists Copyright Society and 'London Loves The Way Things Fall Apart' (2009) and "This Is England" (2011) for Galleria Aus18, Milan.

Semple's exploration of British cultural themes have also been seen in the exhibition "This Is England" (2010) initially held at The Aubin Gallery (which he directed in association with Aubin & Wills and Shoreditch House) featuring artists Sarah Maple, Nicky Carvell, David Hancock and Richard Galloway which then toured to Milan.

In 2011 Semple curated the Mindful exhibition in the  Old Vic Tunnels featuring artists including Jake and Dinos Chapman, Tracey Emin, Mona Hatoum, Mat Collishaw, Sebastian Horsley, Sarah Lucas, Barney Bubbles, Liliane Lijn, Tessa Farmer and Semple. It coincided with a gala dinner at The Imperial War Museum hosted by Stephen Fry and Lord Melvyn Bragg to raise funds for the Mind creative therapies fund and explore the relationship between creativity and mental health.

References

External links

 Stuart Semple Website

1980 births
Alumni of Bretton Hall College
Living people
20th-century English painters
English male painters
21st-century English painters
British pop artists
Artists from Bournemouth
20th-century English male artists
21st-century English male artists